Brian Nolan (born November 28, 1979) is an American actor and producer, best known for starring as Frankie on all current seasons of Here! TV’s The Lair and as a producer on the Netflix films Secret Obsession and Fatal Affair.

As an actor, Nolan has appeared on the Disney Channel's Hannah Montana, Nickelodeon’s iCarly , and in numerous television movies and independent films.

Nolan has been a producer on over 80 made-for-television films.

Raised in Lake Mary, Florida, he attended Lake Mary High School, where he was crowned Prom King in 1998. He is a graduate of the University of Central Florida, where he majored in theater.

References

External links

Brian Nolan at the 2009 Human Rights Campaign

Living people
American gay actors
Male actors from Orlando, Florida
American male film actors
American male television actors
University of Central Florida alumni
1979 births
21st-century LGBT people